Tennis Borussia Berlin is a football club based in Berlin-Westend. Founded in 1902, the club played two seasons in the highest tier of the German football league system, the Bundesliga, during the mid-1970s. Listed below are all 37 Tennis Borussia players from those two seasons, plus every other player where their statistics have been recorded. TeBe's Bundesliga representatives have been highlighted in green, whereas current squad players (which can also be found here) are highlighted in purple.

Jürgen Schulz holds the record for the most league appearances for Tennis Borussia with 244, plus 18 DFB-Pokal games for the Veilchen, in itself another record. In 2014, Michael Fuß overtook Norbert Stolzenburg for the record of having scored the most league goals for TeBe. His current total stands at 140 across his three spells with the club.

During two spells in West Berlin, Stolzenburg scored 122 goals in 210 league games, on the way also becoming the top scorer of the 1975–76 2. Bundesliga Nord campaign which helped TeBe to their second 2. Bundesliga title in succession.

In total, 20 different players have played over 100 league games for Tennis Borussia and 17 players have scored 20 goals or more in their TeBe careers.

Table key

Players

External links 
 Official website of Tennis Borussia Berlin

Tennis Borussia Berlin

Tennis Borussia Berlin
Association football player non-biographical articles